François Magnani (7 June 1928 – 5 March 1998) was a Luxembourgian footballer. He played in eight matches for the Luxembourg national football team from 1948 to 1951. He was also part of Luxembourg's squad for the football tournament at the 1948 Summer Olympics, but he did not play in any matches.

References

External links
 
 

1928 births
1998 deaths
Luxembourgian footballers
Luxembourg international footballers
People from Schifflange
Association football goalkeepers